Nicque Daley (born 19 October 2000) is a Jamaican professional footballer who plays as a forward.

Early life and education

Daley attended Clarendon College in Jamaica.

Career

Club
On 22 March 2019, Daley joined USL Championship side Charleston Battery on a four-year deal after playing with Cavalier SC in his native Jamaica. Following the 2022 season, Daley was released by Charleston.

International
Daley played for Jamaica under-20 national team in 2018 and the under-23 team in 2019.

References

External links
 

2000 births
Living people
Jamaican footballers
Jamaican expatriate footballers
Expatriate soccer players in the United States
Charleston Battery players
USL Championship players
Association football forwards
Jamaican expatriate sportspeople in the United States
Cavalier F.C. players
FC Cincinnati 2 players
MLS Next Pro players
Jamaica under-20 international footballers